Tom McFadden is an actor who has starred in film and on television, his first feature movie was in the 1968 movie was Hot Spurs, his other films include Wrong Is Right (1982), A Nightmare on Elm Street 2: Freddy's Revenge (1985), 976-EVIL (1988), and Uncle Sam (1996).

McFadden has starred in several TV movies, including playing Hugh Cleveland in the 1983 miniseries The Winds of War. He has made guest appearances on many TV shows, including Daniel Boone, Gunsmoke, The Fall Guy, The A-Team, The Dukes of Hazzard, Hunter, and The X-Files.

McFadden authored the book "Acting For Real" in 2007.

Select filmography
 1969 They Shoot Horses, Don't They? as Second Trainer
 1972 Cry for Me, Billy as Soldier
 1977 Black Sunday as Farley
 1979 California Dreaming as Dan
 1979 Prophecy as Pilot
 1980 Running Scared as Colonel Williams
 1982 Love & Money as Blair
 1982 Wrong Is Right as Billy Bob Harper
 1985 Moving Violations as Mr. McCarty
 1985 Warning Sign as Deputy Grazio
 1985 A Nightmare on Elm Street 2: Freddy's Revenge as Mr. Webber
 1986 Scorpion as Lieutenant Woodman
 1988 976-EVIL as Minister 
 1990 False Identity as Sheriff 
 1992 Only You as Mr. Ross 
 1996 Uncle Sam as Mac Cronin

External links

American male film actors
American male television actors
Living people
Year of birth missing (living people)
Place of birth missing (living people)